Wolverton Association Football Club, often known simply as Wolverton, was an English football team representing the town of Wolverton (and, for a time, Milton Keynes). The club's motto was "In Omnia Paratus" (lit: "In all things prepared"). The club was wound up in 1992. Until 2007, its former home ground, Wolverton Park had what was believed to be the oldest football stand in the United Kingdom. The ground and immediate area has since been redeveloped into a housing area, Wolverton Park housing development. In November 2012, the football stand structure is still in place, but it has been stripped to act as an ornamental feature on the edge of the community park which has been built on top of the old football pitch.

Club names
The club has had a number of different names during its history, and at one time held the record for the longest club name in English football: "Newport Pagnell & Wolverton London & North Western Railway Amalgamated Association Football Club".

Achievements
Berks & Bucks Senior Cup:
Winners (1): 1892/93
Runners-up (4): 1888/89, 1891/92, 1895/96, 1969/70
Berks & Bucks Benevolent Cup:
Winners (2): 1947/48, 1949/50
Berks & Bucks Junior Cup:
Winners (1): 1904/05
FA Cup:
4th Qualifying Round (1): 1957/58
FA Vase:
3rd Round (4): 1974/75, 1975/76, 1976/77, 1977/78
Southern Football League:
Division 2 Champions (1): 1895–96
Division 2 (London Section) Runners-up (1): 1898–99
Isthmian League:
Division 2 North Runners-up (1): 1986/87
South Midlands League:
Premier Division Champions (2): 1938/39, 1945/46
Premier Division Runners-up (1): 1990/91
United Counties League:
Champions (1): 1913/14
Spartan League:
Premier Division Runners-up (1): 1951/52
Western Division Runners-up (1): 1946/47
Bucks & Contiguous Counties League:
Division 1 Runners-up (1): 1898/99
Athenian League Cup:
Runners-up (1): 1983/84
United Counties League Cup:
Runners-up (1): 1966–67
Kettering & District Charity Cup:
Runners-up (2): 1892/93, 1893/94
Luton & District Charity Cup:
Winners (1): 1926/27
Runners-up (1): 1893/94
Wolverton & District Charity Cup:
Winners (2): 1893/94, 1894/95
Runners-up (2): 1895/96, 1896/97

Notable former players
1. Players that have played/managed in the Football League or any foreign equivalent to this level (i.e. fully professional league).
2. Players with full international caps.
3. Players that hold a club record or have captained the club.

 George Henson went on to play for Northampton Town, Bradford Park Avenue, Sheffield United, Swansea Town and Wolverhampton Wanderers between 1932 and 1939.

See also
Wolverton railway works where almost all the players worked.
Milton Keynes City F.C., which took over Wolverton Park when Wolves went bust.

References

External links
 Save Our Stand? BBC News
 Wolverton Town FC The website for the reformed (in 2004) Wolverton Town FC, based at The New Park, Greenleys following the closure and redevelopment of Wolverton Park for housing

Sport in Milton Keynes
Wolverton
Association football clubs established in 1887
Association football clubs disestablished in 1992
Defunct football clubs in England
Southern Football League clubs
Isthmian League
Athenian League
1887 establishments in England
1992 disestablishments in England
Defunct football clubs in Buckinghamshire
Railway association football teams in England